Pseudogekko is a genus of rare gecko species, commonly known as false geckos.  All 10 known species are found in the Philippines.

Species
There are ten species:
 Central Visayan false gecko, Pseudogekko atiorum 
 Luzon false gecko, Pseudogekko brevipes 
 Zamboanga false gecko, Pseudogekko chavacano 
 Philippine false gecko, Pseudogekko compresicorpus 
 Leyte diminutive false gecko, Pseudogekko ditoy 
 Bicol hollow-dwelling forest gecko, Pseudogekko hungkag 
 Romblon Province false gecko, Pseudogekko isapa 
 Southern Philippine false gecko, Pseudogekko pungkaypinit 
 Polillo false gecko, Pseudogekko smaragdinus 
 Bicol false gecko, Pseudogekko sumiklab

References 

 
Lizard genera
Taxa named by Edward Harrison Taylor